Cheiracanthium ienisteai is a spider species found in Albania and Romania.

See also 
 List of Eutichuridae species

References

External links 

ienisteai
Spiders of Europe
Spiders described in 1985